Standesamt Tremessen was a civil registration district (Standesamt) located in Kreis Mogilno, province of Posen of the German Empire (1871-1918) and administered the communities of:

Population data may be inaccurate (see German census of 1895).

External links

This article is part of the project Wikipedia:WikiProject Prussian Standesamter. Please refer to the project page, before making changes.

Civil registration offices in the Province of Posen